Without Condition is the debut album by contemporary Christian music singer Ginny Owens. It charted two Billboard album charts, peaking at number 39 on the Heatseekers Albums chart and number 25 on the Top Contemporary Christian music chart. The song "If You Want Me To" became her signature song.

To celebrate the album's twentieth anniversary in 2019, Owens release six videos of reflections songs from the album. Some videos feature people who contributed to the album, such as Michael W. Smith and Don Donahue.

Track listing

Personnel

Musicians 
 Ginny Owens – vocals, keyboards, acoustic piano
 Jeff Roach – keyboards, acoustic piano
 Michael W. Smith – keyboards, acoustic piano
 Gary Burnette – guitars
 Mark Hill – bass
 Greg Herrington – drums
 Dan Needham – drums
 Lisa Cochran – backing vocals
 Dennis Wilson – backing vocals
 Curtis Wright – backing vocals

Production 
 Monroe Jones – producer
 Don Donahue – executive producer
 Michael W. Smith – executive producer
 Jim Dineen – engineer
 Eric Elwell – engineer
 Tom Laune – mixing
 Hank Williams – mastering at MasterMix (Nashville, Tennessee)
 Diana Lussenden – art direction, artwork, design, stylist

Track information and credits adapted from the album's liner notes.

Charts

References

1999 debut albums
Ginny Owens albums